I Love Luci is a short film, written and directed by Colin Kennedy, and produced by Brian Coffey for Sigma Films. It was awarded the BAFTA Scotland in 2011 for Best Short Film.

Synopsis 
The short film I Love Luci is a story of unrequited love and a dog's potential to influence the fortunes of a could-be couple. Marjorie, after a night of partying, seems to have lost her false teeth the day before her boyfriend is set to be released from prison. When she goes out the next day to walk her dog, she encounters her friend Tommy, who causes both chaos and assistance in Marjorie's day.

Production 
Based upon an encounter that writer Colin Kennedy had near his office building, which also housed a heroin rehabilitation clinic, the film built upon a conversation he overheard between two addicts. Unlike others who frequented the building, this couple were both happy and endearing, qualities which sparked the idea that became the film.

Kennedy and casting director Kathleen Crawford cast established actress and model Camilla Rutherford in the lead role of Marjory and newly discovered actor Colin Harris, only six months out of drama school, in the role of the lovesick Tommy. The combination of two actors at different stages of their careers brought a sense of balance to the completed film.

Cast 
Camilla Rutherford as Marjorie
Colin Harris as Tommy
Wilson the dog as Luci
Martin Docherty as Scumbag
Leo Horsfield as Sidekick
Sanjeev Kohli as the chemist
Jimmy Chisholm as the dentist

Release 
I Love Luci has been invited to attend/compete at more than 50 international film festivals around the world including Palm Springs, AFI Film Fest, São Paulo and Clermont-Ferrand.

I Love Luci had a theatrical release in Scotland and France.  Worldwide rights are represented by sales agent Network Ireland Television.

Awards 

2011
 BAFTA Scotland – Best Short Film
 Manhattan Short – Bronze Medal
 Prague ISFF – Audience Award
 Almeria ISFF – Audience Award, Best Screenplay
 Brussels ISFF – Special Jury Award

2010
 Clermont-Ferrand ISFF – Prix des Mediatheques
 Interfilm Berlin – Best Fiction
 Curtas Vila do Conde – Audience Award
 FatFilmFest – Best Short Film
 Bergen Youth Film Festival – Special Jury Mention
 Glasgow SFF – Special Jury Mention
 Rushes Soho Shorts – Runner-up

References

External links
 
 Network Ireland Television

British short films
2010s English-language films